Alfred George Ernest Tasker (born 16 June 1934) was an English first-class cricketer who played in one match, keeping wicket for Worcestershire against Cambridge University in 1956. He took one catch, to dismiss future Test player Bob Barber, but Worcestershire declared in both their innings before he had a chance to bat; he never did get an opportunity.

External links
 

1934 births
Living people
English cricketers
Worcestershire cricketers
Wicket-keepers